Erik Kromann (born 1946) is a Danish author, museums director for Marstal Maritime Museum since 1980 and a local politician. Kromann has also assisted in many TV-broadcasts and TV-shows about Maritime History. He was born in the town of Marstal, on Aeroe.

Sources 
 https://web.archive.org/web/20090903073249/http://www.marstal-maritime-museum.dk/

Living people
1946 births
Danish male writers
People from Ærø Municipality
Date of birth missing (living people)